Stand Like Giants is the seventh album by South African rock band the Parlotones. It was produced by Theo Crous, and was released on 1 September 2013 on Sovereign Entertainment. It includes their hit radio single, "Sleepwalker".

Track listing

Personnel
Kahn Morbee – lead vocals, rhythm guitar
Paul Hodgson – lead guitar
Glen Hodgson – bass guitar, backing vocals
Neil Pauw – drums

References

2013 albums
The Parlotones albums